Funtana Coberta (Sardinian: Sa Funtana Coberta) is a holy pit (subterranean temple) in Sarrabus-Gerrei, a traditional subregion of Sardinia, Italy. Dating to c. 1200–850 BC, it is included in the territory of Ballao, in the province of Cagliari. It was excavated in 1918 by Antonio Taramelli, and again in 1994 by Maria Rosaria Manunza.

It is composed of roughly parallelepiped-shaped limestone rocks, with a length of 10.60 m.

External links
Ballao, Pozzo Sacro di Funtana Coberta

Sources

Archaeological sites in Sardinia
Bronze Age sites